This article refers to one of the former prefectures of Chad. From 2002 the country was divided into 18 regions.

Ouaddaï was one of the 14 prefectures of Chad. Located in the east of the country, Ouaddaï covered an area of 76,240 square kilometers and had a population of 543,900 in 1993. Its capital was Abéché.

See also
Ouaddai Kingdom

External links
 The World Factbook (CIA)

References

Prefectures of Chad